Alain Barudoni (born 19 April 1940) is a Swiss fencer. He competed in the team sabre event at the 1972 Summer Olympics.

References

1940 births
Living people
Swiss male fencers
Olympic fencers of Switzerland
Fencers at the 1972 Summer Olympics